Dražen Marović (born January 14, 1938 in Split) is a Croatian chess player who was active in former Yugoslavia, later a trainer, journalist, writer and broadcaster.

Biography 

Despite learning the game at the relatively late age of sixteen, he made remarkable progress to finish second in the Yugoslav Junior Championship, just two years later. In pursuit of a profession, he obtained a degree in Literature which, when coupled with his gift for languages, provided him with a lifetime vocation, teaching Italian, Spanish and English.

Along with the academic achievements, came even greater advances in his chess playing skills and the improvements were reflected in his international tournament results; Zagreb 1964 (2nd= with Bruno Parma after László Szabó), Málaga 1968 (1st= with Borislav Ivkov), Zagreb 1971 (1st), Zagreb 1972 (2nd= with Mato Damjanovic and Vlastimil Hort after Leonid Stein), Virovitica 1978 (1st) and Sainte-Maxime 1982 (1st).

Equally impressive was his fourth-place finish in a strong field competing at Skopje 1970, where he outscored, among others, Yugoslavia's then number one Svetozar Gligorić and Yuri Balashov. With these international successes came the award of International Master and International Grandmaster titles in 1965 and 1975 respectively.

Marović first represented Yugoslavia in team competition at the European Team Chess Championship of 1961 at Oberhausen, an effort that contributed to a silver team medal. Further selection for the Hamburg 1965 event brought about the same outcome, while he also notched up an impressive 70% individual score. In between times he was a member of Yugoslavia's team at the World Student Team Championships of 1962, 1963 and 1964, his participation helping to secure team silver medals on two more occasions.

He became inactive as a chess player in the early 1990s, choosing to devote much more of his time to training, journalism and authoring chess books. He has coached individuals and national teams, including his own nation, Croatia. Among his students who made notable achievements have been Bojan Kurajica, the World Junior Champion in 1965 and Mohammed Al-Modiahki, the first Grandmaster from an Arab country.

He has provided expert commentary on televised chess events and was for a time the editor of a prominent chess magazine in his home country, Sahovski Glasnik. Book writing may however be the area in which Marović has really excelled. During the 1970s, 80s and 90s he followed the boom in opening theory, authoring popular texts on mainstream openings, such as the King's Indian Defence and Queen's Gambit. He also penned some repertoire books, including Opening Repertoire for Black (co-authored with Bruno Parma) and An Active Repertoire For Black (Batsford, 1991). Since 2000, he has been writing for Gambit Publications and his work has changed direction, delving more deeply into his experiences as a player and trainer, by focusing on elements of strategy and dynamics in chess. His books have been well received by the public and reviewers alike.

Outside of chess, Marović has listed football, cinema and reading among his favourite interests and hobbies.

Recent bibliography 

Understanding Pawn Play in Chess (Gambit, 2000)
Dynamic Pawn Play in Chess (Gambit, 2001)
Secrets of Positional Chess (Gambit, 2003)
Secrets of Chess Transformations (Gambit, 2004)

References

Olimpbase - Olympiads and other Team event information

External links

1938 births
Living people
Chess grandmasters
Croatian chess players
Yugoslav chess players
Croatian chess writers
Sportspeople from Split, Croatia